ROCK.IT is a  superyacht launched at the Feadship yard in Aalsmeer. The yacht was designed by Dutch design company Sinot Exclusive Yacht Design, who also worked with Feadship on the  twins Musashi and Fountainhead. The yacht is owned by Jimmy John Liautaud, who was involved in almost every aspect of the yacht's creation.

Design 
The hull is built out of steel while the material of the superstructure is made out of aluminium with teak laid decks. The yacht is Lloyd's registered, issued by Cayman Islands.

ROCK.IT accommodates ten guests with four guest staterooms, as well as the owner’s stateroom. The thirteen crew members are accommodated by six crew cabins. Storage rooms, laundry, the galley and the crew mess are all located on the lower deck.

The yacht has three bars, as well as deck spaces with a variety of dining options. ROCK.IT also has multiple outdoor lounges, including a sun deck with seating and a Jacuzzi flanked by sun pads.

Engines 
She has a fuel capacity of 120,000 liters, a water capacity of 24,000 liters, and a range of 5300 miles at 12 knots. She also features at-anchor stabilizers.

Usage
The yacht has logged over 17,000 nautical miles in the first nine months after delivery, and almost 40,000 miles as of September 2017. It has travelled around the world to destinations including Bermuda, the Keys, Panama, Costa Rica, Mexico, Montauk and the Galápagos, among others.

ROCK.IT has hosted a number of famous guests, including Kid Rock.

Awards and recognition
ROCK.IT was a finalist in the World Superyacht Awards 2015, Displacement Motor Yachts of 500GT to 1,299GT category, as well as in the Showboat Design Awards 2016, Interior Design Award – Motor Yacht over 500GT and Naval Architecture Award – Displacement Motor Yacht categories.

She has been featured in a number of publications, including Boat International, Show Boats International, and The Superyacht Report.

See also
 List of motor yachts by length
 List of yachts built by Feadship

References

2014 ships
Motor yachts
Ships built in the Netherlands